The Euphasmatodea, also known by its junior synonym Verophasmatodea is a suborder of the Phasmatodea, which contains the vast majority of the extant species of stick and leaf insects, excluding the Timematodea. The oldest record of Euphasmatodea is Araripephasma from the Crato Formation of Brazil, dating to the Aptian stage of the Early Cretaceous.

Superfamilies and families
The suborder was divided into two infraorders: the Areolatae and Anareolatae, based on the presence or absence of an "areola": the of a small ring of colour or gap in wing margin - see the Glossary of entomology terms.  This division has now been superseded with the "suborder Agathemerodea ... downgraded and Areolatae/Anareolatae divisions removed, leaving the existing four superfamilies in Euphasmatodea".

Aschiphasmatoidea
Auth. Brunner von Wattenwyl, 1893
 †Archipseudophasmatidae
 Aschiphasmatidae - Brunner von Wattenwyl, 1893 (Tropical Southeast Asia)
 Damasippoididae - Zompro, 2004 (Madagascar)
 Prisopodidae - Brunner von Wattenwyl, 1893 (Central and South America, south Africa, India, Indo-China, Malesia)

Bacilloidea
Auth. Brunner von Wattenwyl, 1893
 Anisacanthidae - Günther, 1953 (Madagascar)
 Bacillidae - Brunner von Wattenwyl, 1893 (Africa, Europe)
 Heteropterygidae - Kirby, 1896 (Australasia, east and southeast Asia)

Phyllioidea
Auth. Brunner von Wattenwyl, 1893
 Phylliidae - Brunner von Wattenwyl, 1893 (Australasia, Asia, Pacific)

Pseudophasmatoidea
Auth. Rehn, 1904; especially Americas, Madagascar, Asia, Australasia, Europe
 Agathemeridae - Bradler, 2003 (monotypic)
 Heteronemiidae - Rehn, 1904
 Pseudophasmatidae - Rehn, 1904

Infraorder Anareolatae
The following three families were previously placed in the "Anareolatae", but are currently (2021) considered incertae sedis.
 Diapheromeridae - Kirby, 1904 - Worldwide distribution (except the Antarctic)
 Lonchodidae - Brunner von Wattenwyl, 1893 - Worldwide, but especially southern Africa, Asia & Australia
 Phasmatidae - Gray, 1835 - Asia, Australasia, Americas (especially South), Pacific, Africa

References

External links

 Phasmid Study Group: Verophasmatodea

Phasmatodea
Insect suborders